Originally, Trio Los Panchos are a trío romántico formed in New York City in 1944 by Alfredo Gil, Chucho Navarro, and Hernando Avilés. The trio became one of the leading exporters of the bolero and the romantic ballad in Latin America. Its original founding members have long since died and its current members are Chucho Navarro Jr., Eduardo Beristian and Misael Reyes.

The group has sold hundreds of millions of records since its creation in the mid 1940s. Some of their best known songs being their interpretations of classic folk songs such as "Besame Mucho", "Sabor a Mí", "Sin Ti", "Solamente Una Vez", "Contigo", "Quizas, Quizas, Quizas", "Contigo Aprendi", "Aquellos Ojos Verdes", "Cuando vuelva a tu lado", "Se te olvida", "El Reloj", "Noche de Ronda", "Rayito de Luna".

Los Panchos are regarded as one of the top musical trios of all time and one of the most influential Latin American artists of all time. They have sold out concerts around the globe for over 70 years and have appeared in more than 50 films. 

A characteristic instrument of Los Panchos and other Mexican tríos románticos since the 1950s is the requinto guitar, which is smaller and tuned higher than a standard guitar. Requinto solos are found in many bolero recordings by Los Panchos.

History
Los Panchos first met in 1944 in New York City.  The three original members were Chucho Navarro, and Alfredo Gil, both from Mexico, and Hernando Avilés from Puerto Rico. All three played guitar and contributed vocally.

Los Panchos reached fame with their romantic songs, especially in Latin America where they are still regarded as one of the top trios of all time. They sold millions of records in Latin America and other countries. In the 1940s they collaborated with Alfredo Antonini's Viva America Orchestra with the orchestral accordionist John Serry Sr. in a recording of "La palma" (a cueca) and "Rosa negra" (a conga) for Pilotone Records (#45 5067, #45 5069). They also appeared in around 50 movies, mostly during the Golden Age of Mexican cinema.

By 1946, the trio's exceptional virtuosity and authenticity had attracted the attention of Edmund Chester at CBS Radio's Cadena de Las Americas (Network of the Americas). Los Panchos was immediately invited to perform as "musical ambassadors" on the network's Viva America program to support cultural diplomacy in twenty countries throughout Latin America and South America. 

Los Panchos began touring internationally in 1946 and would relocate later that same year to Mexico City. They were welcomed with open arms and XEW-AM, the most popular radio station in Mexico City, reserved a time slot for their music. In 1951, Los Panchos launched another international tour across Latin America.  Julito Rodríguez joined the group in 1952; he was replaced by Johnny Albino in 1958. 

In 1964, CBS proposed to the members of the trio, then made up of the two founding members and Johnny Albino, to accompany a female voice for the first time. It was about the American vocalist of Judeo-Spanish descent Eydie Gormé, who had several years of recording experience in the United States and who was just beginning to record in Spanish. The collaboration between Gormé and Los Panchos recorded a series of bestselling albums in the 1960s such as Great Love Songs In Spanish (titled Amor, in Spanish). The Albino era was one of the most prosperous ones for Los Panchos whose classic albums are very popular among Los Panchos fans still. His departure in 1968 was a tumultuous one, as he did not leave on good terms with the group's management.

In 1971, Ovidio Hernández joined the band as lead vocalist, a part he would fulfill until his untimely passing of complications of meningitis in 1976. Following him, Rafael Basurto Lara joined as lead singer.

[David Ortiz]: A very interesting note, and one that not everyone knows about, is that during the illness of Ovidio Hernández and the integration of Rafael Basurto to the trio, Alfredo Gil (the trio’s director) met the Puerto Rican singer, David Ortiz, in New York City, and amazed by the quality of his voice and style, asked him to come to Mexico and sing with Los Panchos. David Ortiz accepted the invitation and was with the Trio Los Panchos for several months. Alfredo Gil considered David to be one of the most exciting and talented voices to ever sing with Los Panchos. However, after fulfilling several commitments with the trio, David Ortiz returned to New York.

Alfredo Gil played with Los Panchos until his retirement in 1981; he died in 1999. Chucho Navarro played with the group until his death in 1993. Currently the trio using the Los Panchos name is the Trio Los Panchos de Chucho Navarro Fundador ("Trio Los Panchos of Founder Chucho Navarro") under the direction of Chucho Navarro Jr., the son of original Los Panchos member Chucho Navarro.

Discography

 1945 – Mexicantos
 1946 - La Palma (Trio Los Panchos and the Viva América Orchestra conducted by Alfredo Antonini with John Serry Sr.)
 1949 – Ritmos tropicales
 1949 – Boleros selectos, Vol. 1 
 1950 – Los Panchos Favorites
 1955 – Boleros selectos, Vol. 2
 1955 – Así cantan Los Panchos
 1956 – Canciones para una noche de lluvia
 1956 – Vaya con Dios
 1956 – Canciones del corazón
 1956 – South Of The Border - Agustín Lara Hits
 1956 – Mexican Holiday
 1957 – Eva Garza
 1958 – Un minuto de amor
 1959 – Trío Los Panchos y Chucho Martínez Gil
 1959 – Siete notas de amor
 1960 – Los Panchos con Johnny Albino cantan
 1960 – Canciones del corazón
 1960 – Los favoritos de todo el mundo
 1960 – Los Panchos en Tokyo
 1961 – Ciudadanos del mundo
 1961 – Ambassadors of Song
 1961 – Ceguera de amor
 1961 – Los Panchos en Japón
 1962 – Época de oro
 1962 – Los Panchos cantan tangos
 1962 – El Trío Los Panchos interpreta Guty Cárdenas
 1962 – El pecador
 1962 – México canta
 1962 – Favoritos latinos
 1963 – A mi madrecita
 1963 – Cantan a Paraguay
 1963 – Love Songs of the Tropics - Trio Los Panchos Sing the Songs of Rafael Hernández Marín
 1963 –  Romantic Guitars - El Trio Los Panchos Y Las Canciones De Pedro Flores
 1964 – By Special Request Sing Great Love Songs In English
 1964 – Caminemos
 1964 – Amor (Great Love Songs In Spanish) (with Eydie Gormé)
 1964 – Los Panchos en el Japón
 1964 – Recuerdos...
 1965 – More Amor / Cuatro vidas (with Eydie Gormé)
 1965 – El pescador de estrellas
 1965 – Obsesión
 1965 – Los Panchos en persona
 1965 – Horas nuestras
 1966 – Que no te cuenten cuentos
 1966 – Celoso
 1966 – Blanca Navidad / Navidad Means Christmas (with Eydie Gormé)
 1967 – Los Panchos en estéreo, Vol. 1
 1967 – Con éxitos de Armando Manzanero
 1967 – En Venezuela
 1967 – Hey, Amigo! The Trío Los Panchos Sing Great Popular Country Hits in Spanish with The Jordanaires
 1968 – Los Panchos en estéreo, Vol. 2
 1968 – Gigliola Cinquetti e il Trio Los Panchos in Messico
 1968 – Con mariachi
 1970 – Liliana
 1970 – Los Panchos En Japón, Vol. 2
 1970 – Los Panchos Cantan a Agustín Lara
 1970 – Trío Los Panchos
 1971 – Volví la espalda
 1971 – Voces internacionales con Los Panchos
 1971 – Basura
 1971 – Háblame
 1972 – Lo dudo
 1972 – Frío en el alma
 1972 – Martha (with Estela Raval)
 1972 – Quiero
 1972 – Cantan al Perú
 1972 – Adulterio
 1972 – La hiedra
 1973 – El tiempo que te quede libre
 1973 – Tú me acostumbraste (with Estela Raval)
 1974 – Gil, Navarro y Hernández
 1974 – Yo lo comprendo
 1976 – Cantan a Latinoamérica
 1976 – Sabor a mí
 1977 – Si tú me dices ven (Lodo)
 1981 – España en la voz de Los Panchos
 1982 – Los Panchos en Brasil
 1985 – Homenaje a Carlos Gardel
 1985 – La nave del olvido
 1989 – Esencia romántica
 1991 – Siglo veinte
 1991 – Triunfamos
 1991 – Hoy

References

External links
 Official blog of Trio Los Panchos de Chucho Navarro Fundador

Mexican musical groups
Mexican musical trios
Musical groups established in 1944
Columbia Records artists